The Eleventh Hour is the fourth studio album by English rock band Magnum, released in 1983 by Jet Records. The production of this album caused a lot of tension between the band and Jet Records, following the two-year delay to the previous album, Chase the Dragon in 1982 and their first album, Kingdom of Madness, in 1978. These tensions were further strained when Jet Records denied the band a big name producer, leaving them to produce the album themselves.

The Eleventh Hour! was released in May 1983, peaking at No. 38 in the UK charts, disappointing considering Chase the Dragons peak of No. 17 in 1982. The Eleventh Hour!s original title was to be Road to Paradise. The 2005 expanded version of the album was reissued on 22 September 2006 in Japan with mini LP/paper sleeve packaging through Arcangelo. The album was also included in a limited edition Japanese box set, comprising all six of Sanctuary Records expanded and remastered releases with mini LP/paper sleeve packaging. The set included an outer box with Magnum's Chase the Dragon artwork.

Artwork
The cover art was designed by Rodney Matthews.

"The Eleventh Hour! illustration was mostly the brainchild of Magnum's Tony (the hat) Clarkin, a likeable 'Brummie' of eccentric appearance. He came to my studio where we listened to lyrics and he scribbled out a little sketch indicating the figure on the throne, the group of young children and the industrial wasteland. The aircraft (like ducks on a wall) and the unreasoning shark missiles in their silos were my own contribution.

"Tony had joked that his idea for the title of the record had come from his impression of Jet Records who appeared to leave everything until the last minute, though he did explain a deeper significance, one which I think becomes obvious from the artwork.

"Many of Clarkin's lyrics show a deep concern for the shortcomings of our civilization and the injustices which occur, although he is not advocating any revolutionary solutions. The changes have to come from each individual." – Rodney Matthews

"Magnum's The Eleventh Hour! was another Tony Clarkin design and is a sort of "Last Days" scenario." – Rodney Matthews

Bonus tracks
Sanctuary Records released a 2005 remastered and expanded edition with bonus tracks."The Word" (disc 1, 11)
This was recorded in 1982 at Portland Studios, London and we decided to commission Louis Clarke (at great expense) to arrange and conduct The London Philharmonic Orchestra, subsequently recorded at Abbey Road Studios, London. – Tony Clarkin

This track was later released as the B-Side to "Just Like an Arrow"."True Fine Love" (disc 1, 12)
This was recorded at Portland Studios in early 1982 and was originally intended for "The Eleventh Hour" but was thought to be a bit too rock 'n' roll for that album. We are pleased to see its release now. – Tony Clarkin"The Prize", "Breakdown", "Vicious Companions" and "Road to Paradise" (disc 1, 13 – 16)
These tracks were recorded for a Radio 1 Friday Rock Show Session on 13 May 1983. The session has Robin George on rhythm guitar and was first broadcast on 27 May 1983. The session was produced by Tony Wilson and engineered by Dave Dade."The Prize" and "One Night of Passion" (disc 1, 17 – 18)
were released in 1993 on Magnum's acoustic album, Keeping the Nite Light Burning.

Track listing

Personnel
Bob Catley – vocals
Tony Clarkin – guitar
Wally Lowe – bass guitar
Mark Stanway – keyboards
Kex Gorin – drumsAdditional musiciansRobin George – rhythm guitar (on 13 – 16)Production'
Recorded at Portland Studios, London
Mixed at Odyssey Studios, London
Produced by Tony Clarkin
Assisted by Bob Catley
Engineered by Dave Garland

Release history

References

External links
 www.magnumonline.co.uk – Official Magnum site
 The Eleventh Hour: Expanded Edition – Sanctuary Records' mini site
 Record Covers – at rodneymatthews.com

Magnum (band) albums
1983 albums
Jet Records albums
Albums with cover art by Rodney Matthews